Murafa may refer to

Villages
 Murafa, Vinnytsia Oblast
 Murafa, Kharkiv Oblast

Rivers
 Murafa, a tributary of the Dniester